Pier Filippo Mazza (born 20 August 1988) is a Sammarinese footballer who last played for A.S.D. Sant'Ermete in Italy.

He has been capped by the San Marino national football team and made his international debut in 2010.

References

1988 births
Living people
Sammarinese footballers
San Marino international footballers
Association football midfielders